South African alternative rock band Kongos has released five studio albums.

Albums

Studio albums

Instrumental albums

EPs

Singles

As lead artist

As featured artist

Music videos

Notes

References

External links
 
 Kongos discography at Discogs

Discographies of South African artists